Nelson Nunatak is a mainly ice-covered nunatak in the middle of Hand Glacier, in the Victory Mountains, Victoria Land. Mapped by United States Geological Survey (USGS) from surveys and U.S. Navy air photos, 1960–64. Named by Advisory Committee on Antarctic Names (US-ACAN) for Thomas R. Nelson, U.S. Navy, construction mechanic at McMurdo Station, 1967.

The nunatak is part of the Selkirk Mountain System

References

Nunataks of Victoria Land
Borchgrevink Coast